The 10th Pan American Games were held in Indianapolis, United States from 7 to 23 August 1987. Antigua and Barbuda competed for the third time at the Pan American Games.

Results by event

See also
Antigua and Barbuda at the 1988 Summer Olympics

References

Nations at the 1987 Pan American Games
Pan American Games
1987